Paphiopedilum barbigerum is a species of flowering plant in the family Orchidaceae known commonly as the beard carrying paphiopedilum. It is native to China, Vietnam, and Thailand. It is an endangered species due to habitat destruction and overcollection for the horticultural trade.

This orchid grows in soil, on rocks, or on tree trunks in limestone habitat types. It produces 4 to 6 linear green leaves up to 19 centimeters long. It blooms in a single flower on a hairy brownish stalk. The flower is up to 8 centimeters wide. The dorsal sepal is white with a greenish or brownish spot at the base. The synsepal is pale green and the petals are brownish with pale edges. The staminode is yellow.

This species is pollinated by hoverflies, in particular Allograpta javana and Episyrphus balteatus.

Sources 

barbigerum
Orchids of China
Orchids of Vietnam
Orchids of Thailand
Endangered plants
Taxonomy articles created by Polbot